The Swedish National Badminton Championships is a tournament organized to crown the best badminton players in Sweden.

The tournament started in the season 1936/1937 and is held every year.

Past winners

References
 Details of affiliated national organisations at Badminton Europe
 Sweden at badmintonpeople.com

Badminton in Sweden
National badminton championships
Recurring sporting events established in 1936
Badminton tournaments in Sweden
1936 establishments in Sweden
Badminton